The Chinese Elm cultivar Ulmus parvifolia 'Geisha' is a dwarf variety.

Description
Rarely exceeding 2 m in height, 'Geisha' is distinguished by its small, variegated leaves  .

Pests and diseases
The species and its cultivars are highly resistant, but not immune, to Dutch elm disease, and unaffected by the Elm Leaf Beetle Xanthogaleruca luteola.

Cultivation
Relatively common in cultivation in Europe, it is not known to have been introduced to North America or Australasia.

Accessions

Europe
Grange Farm Arboretum, Lincolnshire, UK. Acc. no. 1142.
Hortus Botanicus Nationalis, Salaspils, Latvia. Acc. no. 18152.
Royal Horticultural Society Gardens, Wisley, UK No details available
Sir Harold Hillier Gardens, UK. Acc. no. 1991.0894
Strona Arboretum, University of Life Sciences, Warsaw, Poland.

Nurseries

Europe

(Widely available)

References

Chinese elm cultivar
Ulmus articles missing images
Ulmus